Bhrigu Phukan was a leader of Asom Gana Parishad and a cabinet minister in Government of Assam. He was one of the three signatories to the Assam Accord. Phukan was born on 25 April 1956.
He was elected for three consecutive terms from the prestigious Jalukbari constituency to the Assam Legislative Assembly from 1985.

Early life 

He was a graduate of Dibrugarh University. He also obtained Law Degree from Gauhati University. He became closely involved in the students union movement during the university days that catapulted him to its leadership. He had been in the vanguard of the anti-foreigners agitation for six years during which period Assam was rocked by unprecedented blood-letting which left close to 900 people dead.

Political career 

He was the general secretary of All Assam Students Union during 1979-85 and jointly spearheaded the Assam Movement with Prafulla Kumar Mahanta over the issue of Bangladeshi influx. He was one of the three signatories of the Assam Accord of 1985 along with Prafulla Kumar Mahanta.

In 1985 after the conclusion of the Assam movement with the signing of the historic Assam Accord, peace was restored in the state, and Phukan along with others founded the Asom Gana Parishad. In December 1985, he became Home minister at the age of 29 after the Asom Gana Parishad won the historic Assembly elections under the Chief Ministership of Mahanta. Phukan later fell out with Mahanta and in February 1991 walked out of Asom Gana Parishad to form the Natun Asom Gana Parishad.

The two factions united three years later and Phukan was appointed executive president of the Asom Gana Parishad. He quit the Asom Gana Parishad again in 1996 following differences with Mahanta and joined another political party.

In 2001, Phukan lost as a Nationalist Congress Party candidate to Himanta Biswa Sarma of the Congress, a student leader whom he had earlier groomed and who joined BJP in 2015.

Phukan again returned to the Asom Gana Parishad in 2004 and contested the Lok Sabha (parliament) elections from Guwahati constituency but lost.

Personal life 

He died of multiple organ failure on 20 March 2006 in the All India Institute of Medical Sciences, New Delhi and is survived by his wife Indira and a daughter Upasa.

References

1956 births
2006 deaths
Assam MLAs 1985–1991
Assam MLAs 1991–1996
Assam MLAs 1996–2001
People from Sivasagar
Asom Gana Parishad politicians
Nationalist Congress Party politicians from Assam
State cabinet ministers of Assam